Zafarabad (also Romanized as Zafarābād; also known as Zafarābād-e Janqoli) is a village in Itivand-e Jonubi Rural District, Kakavand District, Delfan County, Lorestan Province, Iran. At the 2006 census, its population was 144, in 23 families.

References 

Towns and villages in Delfan County